Crampe en masse is a Québécois comedy duo composed of Mathieu Gratton and Ghyslain Dufresne, who were active from 1998 to 2005.

Biography
Their second album Roule-toi par terre sold more than 15,000 copies and won the 2000 Félix Award for Humoristic album of the year.

Discography
Crampe en Masse
Roule-toi par terre!
Chansons drôles de d'autres
Live en studio
Crampe en masse et le hot-dog géant

External links
http://www.crampeenmasse.com - official website

Comedians from Quebec
Canadian comedy duos